The Rogožarski SIM-XII-H (Serbian Cyrillic:Рогожарски СИМ-XII-Х) was a Yugoslav trainer single-engine floatplane, with two floats designed in 1938. It was designed and built at the Rogožarski factory in Belgrade.

Design and development

The YRAF was unsuccessfully trying to choose the most appropriate seaplane for pilot training so they turned to the Rogožarski factory for help in 1937 and ordered the seaplane school project to be made that would fit in its characteristics to the school plane SIM-X. Since it was not possible to make a simple modification (adaptation of existing aircraft SIM-X) for installation of EDO floats, chief designed Sima Milutinović fitted the plane with a more powerful engine Walter Major 6 190 hp, leading to an increase in aircraft size. Thus, this new high-flying school plane with two floats represented an entirely new plane, designated SIM-XII-H. During 1937, the project went into realization stage, and as early as the end of the year the prototype was ready for testing. The test flight was conducted on  February 7, 1938, by test pilot Ivan Koroša in hydro-base Divulje. After the flight tests had achieved satisfactory results, the first  batch of aircraft was ordered, which were delivered in mid-1939.

Aircraft SIM-XII-H, a supported two-seat high-flying plane, with engine Walter Major 6 (190 hp), of predominantly wooden construction, with an elliptical cross-section of fuselage entirely made of wood and covered with plywood, wings as the supporting structure made of wood covered with fabric, with rounded ends. On each side, the wings are supported by a pair of inclined struts attached to the fuselage. The fuel tank was located in the central part between the wings, that is, at their junction. The first series of aircraft had two (a pair of) EDO floats installed (EDO Float Model 47).

Operational history

As for experience with the use of aircraft SIM-XII-H, which was called by pilots and technical staff of the aircraft "little SIM", were very positive and the navy command (Royal Maritime Navy) signed a contract with Rogožarski factory on July 15, 1940 for the second series of these plane (4 aircraft) with the difference that these seaplanes were equipped for instrument, or, "blind" flying. Rogožarski delivered these aircraft in five months but without floats as the delivery from Canada was delayed for several months. Upon the agreement reached between the Rogozarski factory and the Navy command, the design and development of domestic aircraft floats was launched, unfortunately this project did not reach completion due to the outbreak of April war. In the pre-war period two SIM-XII-H aircraft were in  accidents both in Boka Kotorska in 1940. Both aircraft were designated for disposal, so the Navy Command requested approval to install the floats from these planes onto new aircraft ( onto the 2nd series of SIM-XII-H ) considering that these planes were equipped with instruments for instrumental ("blind") flying. When the approval was given, the floats were installed into new planes, so the aircraft in the second series were enabled for use before the war broke out.

Operators

Royal Yugoslav Air Force 9 aircraft
Yugoslav Royal Navy

Specifications

See also

Notes

References

External links

SIM-X (SIM-XI i SIM-XII-H) www.airwar.ru
airserbia.com
Рогожарски СИМ-XII-Х

SIM-XII-H
1930s Yugoslav military aircraft
Floatplanes
Trainer aircraft
Parasol-wing aircraft
Single-engined tractor aircraft